English Retreads was an eco-fashion company that made handbags and accessories from recycled materials.  The company was known for its products that are all low environmental impact, vegan, and handcrafted in Boulder, Colorado. English Retreads offered handbags, wallets, belts, laptop bags and key chains all made from recycled materials, primarily reclaimed rubber and recycled PETE (plastic bottle) material.

History
English Retreads began in 2001 by designer Heather English in the basement of her home in Nederland, Colorado. While floating down Boulder Creek on an old inner tube, English was struck with the idea to create a non-leather handbag from her rubber inner tube to fulfill her need for a sustainable and fashionable product.  Since then, English has expanded the English Retreads line to include vintage rubber messenger bags, wallets, belts, dog collars and key chains.  Truck stops throughout the Boulder area supply English Retreads with the used inner tubes—each of which probably has more than 60,000 miles on it before it gets reinvented.

The company used the url EnglishRetreads.com. They closed in December 2014

Collections
Typically, English Retreads are made completely from reclaimed rubber inner tubes. The products come from trucks and tractors. The rubber is cut, washed, dried, and buffed in order to prepare for resale. It is then cut into specific patterns to form the handbags.
The latest line, "Luxe", uses the rubber inner tubes for the product exterior and colorful PET (Polyethylene terephthalate) material lining for the interior. The PET material is made from 100% recycled plastic bottles. The latest handbag in the collection uses PET material on the outside with accents of inner tube rubber. The handbags come in a variety of shapes and sizes, small enough for a clutch and large enough as a tote.

Industry
English Retreads falls into the luxury goods category of eco-friendly handbags.

In The Media
Media Attention has included features in the New York Times, CBS4 Denver  and The Rocky Mountain News .

References

External links
Skin Deep, All Shopping is Local
What Happens to Clunkers

Manufacturing companies of the United States
Fashion accessory brands
Bags (fashion)
American companies established in 2001
Manufacturing companies established in 2001
2000s fashion